Sutta Pazham is a 2008 Indian Tamil language comedy thriller film directed by G. K.. The film stars Mohan and Shubha Poonja, with R. N. R. Manohar, Livingston, Manobala, Vennira Aadai Moorthy, M. S. Bhaskar, Anu Mohan, Kullamani, and Soundar playing supporting roles. The film had musical score by Sri Sam, cinematography by C. Maya, and editing by R. K. Udhayakumar. The film released on 25 July 2008.

Plot
In Chennai, men and women are mysteriously killed, and the police cannot find a single clue to catch the serial killer. Later, the police cast suspicion on Nandakumar (Mohan), an innocent and single man who runs a resort on the coastal road. They believe that he is a dangerous sexual predator. The police department gives Police Inspector Vandana (Shubha Poonja) the mission of finding enough evidence to convict Nandakumar. Vandana poses as a TV serial dialogue writer and asks Nandakumar for a room in the resort. Nandakumar has no rooms but is under pressure to keep her in his own room in order to gain money and repay his loans.

Mathana tries to seduce Nandakumar on multiple occasions by wearing sexy dresses and exposing her body, but she fails every time. Vandana finally realizes that Nandakumar is an innocent man who has nothing do with that case, and she falls in love with him. Thereafter, Vandhana finds the culprit: the local church father (R. N. R. Manohar) who lives in a church near Nandakumar's resort. The church father finds her in his room. He manages to tie her up, and he then confesses the murders. He tells her that he is not a real church father and he killed the victims for having an extramarital affair or premarital sex. In the meantime, Nandakumar is chased by the police, and he enters the church to hide from them. The police then frees Vandana, and she reveals that the church father is the killer; thus, the church father is arrested. Nandakumar and Vandana live happily ever after.

Cast

Mohan as Nandakumar (Nandu)
Shubha Poonja as Police Inspector Vandana
R. N. R. Manohar as Church Father
Livingston as Inspector Prasad
Manobala as Assistant Commissioner
Vennira Aadai Moorthy as Moorthy
M. S. Bhaskar as Kumaraswamy
Anu Mohan as Mani
Kullamani
Soundar as Head Constable
Chaplin Balu as Man at the wine shop
Udumalai Ravi as Man at the wine shop
Sharmili as Keerthi
Bava Lakshmanan 
Nellai Siva
Gemini Balaji
Sempuli Jagan
Kumtaz

Production
G. K. made his directorial with Sutta Pazham under the banner of Pinttex Creations. The veteran actor Mohan, who was last seen in Anbulla Kadhalukku (1999), returned to the screen to play the lead role, while Shubha Poonja was chosen to play the heroine. The film was shot in Munnar and Chennai. The makers said that film was an adult comedy-thriller, but there was no vulgarity or crudeness.

Soundtrack
The film score and the soundtrack were composed by Sri Sam. The soundtrack features 5 tracks and it was released on 16 July 2008 at the radio station Hello FM in Chennai. The audio launch was attended by actors Mohan, Shaam, M. S. Bhaskar, the film director G. K., the music director Sri Sam, and lyricist Snehan.

Release
The film was released on 25 July 2008 alongside another erotic film, Pathu Pathu. The two films releasing that week were butchered by the censor board and carried "A" certificates as they had an overdose of sex and smutty dialogues.

References

2008 films
2000s Tamil-language films
Indian comedy films
Indian erotic thriller films
Films set in Chennai
Films shot in Chennai
Films shot in Munnar
2008 directorial debut films
Censored films